The list of ship commissionings in 1904 includes a chronological list of all ships commissioned in 1904.


References

See also 

1904
 Ship commissionings